Michael Strum (born July 15, 1963) is an American curler.

In 1992 Strum played lead on his uncle Bud Somerville's team when they won the bronze medal at the 1992 Winter Olympics, where curling was a demonstration event. Also on the team was Strum's father Bill Strum and cousin Tim Somerville.

Personal life
Strum comes from a curling family, his father Bill was a three-time World Champion and two-time Olympian and his mother Betty Ann curled for 25 years.

Teams

References

External links

1963 births
Living people
American male curlers
Curlers at the 1992 Winter Olympics
Olympic curlers of the United States
Sportspeople from Superior, Wisconsin